Ali Banaei is and Iranian Shia cleric and conservative politician who currently serves as the parliamentary advisor to the Judiciary Chief.

He represented Qom in the Iranian Parliament from 2004 to 2012.

Electoral history

References

External links 
 Official website

Living people
1959 births
People from Qom
Deputies of Qom
Members of the 7th Islamic Consultative Assembly
Members of the 8th Islamic Consultative Assembly
Islamic Coalition Party politicians
Islamic Revolutionary Guard Corps clerics